Yarabad-e Olya (also Romanized as Yārābād-e ‘Olyā) is a village in Zarrin Dasht Rural District, in the Central District of Darreh Shahr County, Ilam Province, Iran. At the 2006 census, its population was 91, in 16 families.

References 

Populated places in Darreh Shahr County